The Central Manchester Development Corporation was established in 1988 to develop parts of eastern Manchester. Its flagship developments included the Bridgewater Hall concert auditorium.

During its lifetime, 1.5 m sq.ft. of non-housing development and 2,583 housing units were built. Around 4,944 new jobs were created and some £303m of private finance was leveraged.

The Chairman was Dr James Grigor and the Chief Executive was John Glester.

It was dissolved in 1996.

References

Organisations based in Manchester
Organizations established in 1988
Organizations disestablished in 1996
Defunct public bodies of the United Kingdom
Development Corporations of the United Kingdom
1988 establishments in England